Sarah Ryan is a camogie player who won an All-Ireland Junior Championship medal with Dublin in 2006.  A member of the Good Counsel club, she has a Dublin senior championship title from 2004 and in 2009 she was named Dublin Player of the Year. Ryan was a student at Dublin Institute of Technology and was part of the team that captured the Purcell cup for the first time in college history that year.

References

External links
 Official Camogie Website
 Dublin Camogie website
 ssueId=436|Review of 2009 championship in On The Ball Official Camogie Magazine
 https://web.archive.org/web/20091228032101/http://www.rte.ie/sport/gaa/championship/gaa_fixtures_camogie_oduffycup.html Fixtures and results] for the 2009 O'Duffy Cup
 All-Ireland Senior Camogie Championship: Roll of Honour
 Video highlights of 2009 championship Part One and part two
 Video of Dublin¹s 2009 championship match against Tipperary

1988 births
Living people
Dublin camogie players